Kishtwar National Park is a national park located, just 40 km from Kishtwar town in the Kishtwar district of Jammu and Kashmir, India. It is bounded to the north by Rinnay river, south by Kibar Nala catchment, east by main divide of Great Himalaya and west by Marwah river.

Date and history of establishment
It was declared a National Park on 4 February 1981 (Notification no. 21/FST of 1980-1981).
Area 
Land Tenure state
Altitude Ranges from 1,700 m to 4,800 m

Physical features
The National Park encompasses the catchments of Kiar, Nath and Kibar Nalas, all of which drain south-west into Marwah River (also known as Marusudar River) which joins the Chenab River just below the Kishtwar Town at Bhandarkoot village. The terrain is generally rugged and steep, with narrow valleys bounded by high ridges opening in their  upper glacial parts. The area lies in the Central Crystalline belt of the Great Himalayas. Rocks are strongly folded in places and composed mainly of granite, gneiss and schist, with the occasional bed of marble. The shallow, slightly alkaline soils are mostly alluvial with gravel deposits.

Climate
The influence of the monsoon is weak. Mean annual rainfall at palmar and Sirshi (1,761 m), located near the periphery of the national park, is 827 mm and 741 mm, respectively, precipitation is maximal and in excess of 100 mm per month in March and April, and again in July and August. Most snow fall in December and January when the whole area becomes snowbound. Mean maximum and minimum temperatures recorded at Sirshi are 130 and -70  in January and 350c and 110c in July respectively.

Vegetation
Based on revised classification of Champion and Seth (1968), some 13 vegetation types are represented. In general, silver fir 'Abies pindrow' and spruce 'Picea wallichian', mixed with cedar Cedrus deodar and blue pine Pinus griffithii are predominant from 2,400m to 3,000m. Notable is the small expanse of chilgoza pine Pinus geradiana in the Dachan Range. At lower altitudes (1,700-2,400m) occur nearly pure stands of cedar and blue pine, and moist temperate deciduous forest, represented by horsechestnut, Aesculus indica, walnut Juglans regia, maple, Acer spp. poplar, Populus ciliata, hazel Corylus cornutam bird cherry Pasus corfnuta, ash Fraxinus cornuta and yew Taxus wallichiana. The sub-alpine zone, from 3,000m to the tree line at 3,700m, supports mostly silver fir and birch Betula utilis forest and this merges with birch -rhododendron  Rhododendron campanulatum scrub, above which is alpine pasture.

Among the animals that make their home here include the Himalayan snowcock and the brown bear.

Cultural heritage
Racial groups include Kashmiris, Thakurs, Gujars, Rajputs and Brahmans, Bhagats.

Local human population
There are  permanent settlements but some 1,115 families of nomadic graziers, with 25,000 head of livestock, and an unspecified number of families from nearby villages, with 10,000 head, have grazing rights in the national park. Some agriculture is practised in peripheral areas.

References

National parks in Jammu and Kashmir
Kishtwar district
Western Himalayan broadleaf forests
Western Himalayan subalpine conifer forests
1981 establishments in Jammu and Kashmir
Protected areas established in 1981